"Guys My Age" is a song by American rock band Hey Violet. The song was released as a digital download on September 20, 2016. The synth-pop song is about the singer's past upsets with "guys her age" and finding success with a "grown up".

Critical reception
Mike Wass of Idolator wrote that the song is "as ruthless as it is catchy," and praised the pop-oriented direction the group took.

Chart performance
"Guys My Age" debuted at number 84 on the Billboard Hot 100 chart dated February 11, 2017, earning the group their first entry on the chart. It later reached a peak position of 68 on the chart dated March 4, 2017.

Music video
The official music video for "Guys My Age" was released on November 2, 2016. It was filmed at the Madonna Inn in San Luis Obispo, California, and at Cadillac Jack's and Pink Motel in Sun Valley, Los Angeles. Directed by Sophia Ray, it features a surreal dream sequence taking place inside Rena Lovelis' head, with several neon-lit settings.

Charts

References

2016 songs
2016 singles
Indie pop songs
Caroline Records singles
Songs written by Julian Bunetta
Songs written by John Ryan (musician)
Songs written by Cirkut (record producer)
Songs written by Ilsey Juber
Songs written by Jacob Kasher